The Necktie River is a river of Minnesota.

See also
List of rivers of Minnesota

References
Minnesota Watersheds
USGS Geographic Names Information Service
USGS Hydrologic Unit Map - State of Minnesota (1974)

Rivers of Hubbard County, Minnesota
Rivers of Beltrami County, Minnesota